The Distinguished Service Medal (DSM) is a military decoration awarded to personnel of the Australian Defence Force for distinguished leadership in warlike operations. The DSM was introduced in 1991 and is the second highest distinguished service decoration in the Australian Honours System. Recipients of the Distinguished Service Medal are entitled to use the post-nominal letters "DSM". Since its inception 152 awards have been made—which includes six Bars—with the most recent being announced in the 2021 Queen's Birthday Honours.

Government allowance
The Government of Australia may grant an allowance to veterans or serving members of the Australian Defence Force who have been awarded the Distinguished Service Medal, or other awards for gallantry. At November 2007, this allowance was A$2.10 per fortnight.

Description
 The Distinguished Service Medal is ensigned with the Crown of St Edward in nickel-silver. The obverse has a Federation star superimposed on a circle of flames.
 The medal has a nickel-silver suspender bar.
 The medal ribbon has alternating vertical stripes: four silver-blue and three ochre-red.

See also
Distinguished Service Cross (Australia)
Distinguished Service Order (United Kingdom)
Distinguished Service Medal (United Kingdom)
Distinguished Service Cross (United Kingdom)
Australian Honours Order of Precedence

References

External links
It's an Honour

Military awards and decorations of Australia

1991 establishments in Australia
Awards established in 1991